The State Corner Conference was an IHSAA-sanctioned conference located in far Northeast Indiana. The conference started in 1935 competing in basketball, football, and track. The league survived a major shakeup in 1941 as half of the original league left to return to their previous conferences, being replaced by smaller schools in the footprint and dropping football. Because of the league's limited offerings, the schools would also compete within their county-based leagues. The league would fold in 1967, as consolidation had whittled the league to three schools.

Membership

 Played concurrently in SCC and NCC throughout membership.
 Played concurrently in State Corner and Steuben County 1935-41.
 Played concurrently in SCC and DCC 1935-53.
 Played concurrently in SCC and LCC throughout membership.
 Played concurrently in State Corner and Steuben County 1941-64, in State Corner and Bi-County 1964-66, and in State Corner and Northeast Corner 1966-67.

Resources 

Indiana high school athletic conferences
Indiana High School Athletic Association disestablished conferences